Blue Archive is a role-playing game developed by Nexon Games (formerly NAT Games), a subsidiary of Nexon. It was released in 2021 for Android and iOS, first in Japan by Yostar and worldwide later that year by Nexon. The game is free-to-play with gacha game mechanics as a means to obtain new characters. An anime television series adaptation titled Blue Archive The Animation has been announced.

The player and protagonist is a teacher who was summoned to the academy city of Kivotos by the president of the General Student Council, an extrajudicial committee governing the schools. Following her sudden disappearance, criminal activity rises around Kivotos and the player is tasked by the remaining members of the council to resolve the issues and help search for the president.

Gameplay

Blue Archive is a tactical role-playing game that allows the player to form and mobilize units of up to six members (two "Specials" and four "Strikers") to participate in various military campaigns with. Students' strengths can be enhanced in various ways, such as by increasing their levels, weapons, armor and skills. More students can be recruited through the gacha system using in-game currency, which may be purchased through in-app purchases.

The units are mobilized on a turn-based hex map and battle initiates when they interact with an enemy or vice versa. In combat, Strikers march along a straight path and occasionally encounter groups of enemies. Strikers fire automatic attacks and can hide behind objects to decrease their chances of getting hit. Specials do not engage in direct combat but increase the Strikers' stats and support them from the backlines instead. The player has generally no control over battles with the exception of using students' skills that cost a regenerable currency to use. Students and enemies both have rock-paper-scissors-based attacks and defenses, which determine their strengths and weaknesses. Students get rescued by a helicopter and can't participate in later battles if they lose all of their health.

Story

Setting
Blue Archive takes place in the academy city of Kivotos, which was established by the union of thousands of academies. The city is divided into mostly independent districts, with the highest entity being the president of the General Student Council, a federal committee, who governs the city from the Sanctum Tower with access to every students' register. Before the events of the game, the president summons the player character, a teacher referred to as Sensei, to be the advisor of Schale, an extrajudicial organization established by the president herself. She then proceeds to disappear, giving an uprising to criminal activities and military presence in the city.

Plot

Sensei gets woken up by a General Student Council member but gets interrupted by four students who came to report issues happening at their respective schools. The six leave for the Schale building to transfer access from the Sanctum Tower back to the Student Council. Once they arrive, Sensei receives a tablet and, after an AI authenticates them, permission from the tower was restored to the General Student Council and Schale.

Development
Yostar announced the mobile game and held closed beta tests for the Android version in July 2020. Initially scheduled to be released in 2020, it was later moved to February 4, 2021. An English version of the game was announced in August 2021, surpassing one million pre-registrations ahead of its release. Blue Archive was released worldwide on November 8 of the same year by Nexon.

References

External links

 

2021 video games
Android (operating system) games
Anime television series based on video games
Fantasy video games
Free-to-play video games
Gacha games
IOS games
Mobile games
Nexon games
Video games developed in South Korea
Video games featuring non-playable protagonists
Science fiction video games
Tactical role-playing video games
Upcoming anime television series